The Kingdom Kangaroos is an Australian rules football club in Fife, Scotland. The name derives from the relationship with North Melbourne Football Club.

Club sponsors

The first main club sponsor for the Roos was Kingdom FM.

Honours

TyneTees Cup - Winners: 2013

International players
Only players who played in major competitions are included.

Scottish Clansmen
 Iain McGarry (Tri Nation 2013)
 Lisle Young (Tri Nation 2013, Madrid 2014)
 Cameron Goodall (Tri Nation 2013,Madrid 2014)
 Robert Dempsey (Tri Nation 2013)

Inaugural SARFL Team players 26 April 2014
Only players who played in the first SARFL competition game against Edinburgh Bloods.

Kingdom Kangaroos
 Steve Downie
 Ross Barker
 Iain McGarry
 Gavin Scott
 Daniel Balson
 Alex Gregg
 Lisle Young
 Andrew Stenhouse
 Robert Dempsey
 Sam Tidbury
 James Hopgood
 Mark Flanagan
 Nik Balson

References

Australian rules football clubs established in 2013
2013 establishments in Scotland
Sport in Fife
Australian rules football clubs in Scotland